Budoni (Gallurese: Budùni) is a comune (municipality) in the Province of Sassari in the Italian region Sardinia, located about  northeast of Cagliari and about  southeast of Olbia.

The municipality of Budoni contains the frazioni (subdivisions, mainly villages and hamlets) Agrustos (Gall.), Berruiles (Gall.), Birgalavò (Gall.), Limpiddu (Log.), Li Troni (Gall.), Ludduì (Gall.), Lu Linnalvu (Gall.), Luttuni (Gall.), Lutturai (Gall.), Maiorca (Gall.), Malamurì (Gall.), Muriscuvò (Log.), Nuditta (Gall.), Ottiolu (Gall.), San Gavino (Log.), San Lorenzo (Log.), San Pietro (Gall.), San Silvestro (Gall.), S'Iscala (Log.), Solità (Log.), Strugas (Gall.), Tanaunella (Log.), and Tamarispa (Log.).

Budoni borders the following municipalities: Posada, San Teodoro, Torpè.

Demographic evolution

References

External links

 http://www.comune.budoni.ot.it/

Cities and towns in Sardinia
1959 establishments in Italy
States and territories established in 1959